Sham Hill is a volcanic plug in the Pacific Ranges of the Coast Mountains in southwestern British Columbia, Canada, located near the upper Bridge River. It is part of a volcanic group called the Bridge River Cones which in turn is part of the Garibaldi Volcanic Belt of the Canadian Cascade Arc.

See also
 Volcanism of Canada
 List of volcanoes in Canada
 List of Cascade volcanoes

References

Complex volcanoes
Garibaldi Volcanic Belt
Pleistocene volcanoes